The 1954 Bucknell Bison football team was an American football team that represented Bucknell University as an independent during the 1954 college football season. 

In its eighth season under head coach Harry Lawrence, the team compiled a 6–3 record. John Chironna was the team captain.

The team played its home games at Memorial Stadium on the university campus in Lewisburg, Pennsylvania.

Schedule

References

Bucknell
Bucknell Bison football seasons
Bucknell Bison football